Pilaszków  is a village in the administrative district of Gmina Ożarów Mazowiecki, within Warsaw West County, Masovian Voivodeship, in east-central Poland.

External links
 Jewish Community in Pilaszków on Virtual Shtetl

References

Villages in Warsaw West County